Chris Lee Kapenga is an American politician and, since 2015, a member of the Wisconsin State Senate. A member of the Republican Party, he is elected from the 33rd senatorial district. He became the president of the state Senate in 2021.

Early life, education, and early career
Kapenga has a bachelor's degree in accounting from Calvin College. Kapenga is an accountant. He owned a business, Integrated Time Systems, that provides timekeeping systems (software and hardware) to businesses. He sold the business in 2019 to Ascentis Corp. In 2014, Kapenga invested in Eye Care of Wisconsin, an optometrist network; his wife ran the business's operation and Kapenga became its registered agent.

Political career

State Assembly
Kapenga first ran for office in 2010, when he sought election to the Wisconsin State Assembly as a Republican candidate for the 33rd Assembly District in Waukesha County; an open seat in which Republican Scott Newcomer decided not to run for reelection. The district is heavily Republican. He won the Republican primary election with just under 40% of the vote, defeating three other candidates. He ran unopposed in the 2010 general election.

As a state representative, Kapenga where he was a major advocate of enactment of a right-to-work law and repeal of the Wisconsin prevailing wage law, which sets a minimum pay for contractors hired to construct public works.

In 2012, Kapenga ran for a seat in the Wisconsin State Senate. Because there was no Democratic challenger, the November election was between two Republican candidates: Paul Farrow and Kapenga. Farrow won, defeating Kapenga, with Farrow receiving 31,927 votes (52.32%) and Kapenda receiving 29,027 votes (47.57%). Kapenga simultaneously won reelection to his state Assembly seat with 76.28% of the vote, defeating Democratic nominee Thomas D. Hibbard. In 2015, when Kapenga left the Assembly, his seat was filled by Republican Cindi Duchow.

State Senate
In 2014, Kapenga again ran for a seat in the State Senate, but again lost in the Republican primary election. He won the seat in a July 2015 special election, defeating Democratic nominee Sherryll Shaddock, after winning the Republican nomination the preceding month against two other candidates. He ran unopposed for re-election in 2018.

In the Senate, Kapenga has been a longtime supporter of legislation to allow Tesla, Inc. to open dealerships in Wisconsin to sell its vehicles, repealing a provision of Wisconsin state law that bars automakers from controlling or directly operating dealerships. Kapenga owns a business, Integrity Motorsports LLC, that sells Tesla parts and Tesla salvage vehicles. In 2019, the Tesla provision was added to a state budget bill, winning Kapenga's vote.  (Kapenga has previously introduced legislation to change the law to allow Tesla to open dealerships in two previous legislative sessions, but the proposals did not pass. Kapenga described himself as a hobbyist and said that he would not personally profit from the change in the law.

In a 2015 Senate debate, Kapenga supported changes to state campaign finance laws to allow more money in elections, twice saying, "The more money in politics, the better." Also in 2015, Kapenda tweeted that he agreed that a Muslim should not be president, before later deleting the post after he was asked about it by the press.

In 2016, Kapenga (along with state Representative Robert Brooks) introduced legislation to allow Wisconsin landowners to excavate Native American effigy mounds on their property. Under the bill, the Wisconsin Historical Society would allow landowners to excavate to determine whether human remains were present on effigy mounds, and (if no such remains were found), landowners could use the land as they wished. The bill was strongly opposed by the Ho-Chunk Nation and other tribes (who viewed excavation to determine the presence of remains as defeating the purpose of mound protection), and Assembly Speaker Robin Vos blocked the bill from consideration.

In 2017, Kapenga was one of two Senate Republicans to join Democrats in voting against a proposed state constitutional amendment to eliminate the position of State Treasurer of Wisconsin. The measure passed the Senate on an 18–15 vote.

In 2019, Kapenga considered running for a seat in 2020 in the U.S. House of Representatives from Wisconsin's 5th congressional district (covering part of the southeastern portion of the state), to replace retiring Republican Jim Sensenbrenner, but he ultimately chose not to run.

Like most Republican state legislators in Wisconsin, Kapenga opposes Democratic proposals, championed by Governor Tony Evers, to accept federal funds to expand Medicaid to cover more uninsured Wisconsinites.

In October 2020, during the COVID-19 pandemic in Wisconsin, Kapenga claimed, contrary to public health experts, that face masks were not effective in halting the spread of the coronavirus. Kapenga also said that he did not trust data showing a dire strain on Wisconsin hospital capacity. Kapenga also opposed a statewide order issued by Governor Evers requiring the wearing of face coverings in indoor public places, calling the order "illegal."

In November 2020, he was named president of the Wisconsin State Senate for the 2021-22 legislative session. The same month, Kapenga spoke at a pro-Donald Trump rally at which ex-Milwaukee County Sheriff David Clarke called for the Proud Boys, a violent right-wing extremist group, to establish a chapter in Wisconsin. The rally was shut down by the Milwaukee Health Department because it failed to adhere to COVID-19 public-health rules.

In January 2021, amid Trump's failed effort to overturn the results of the 2020 presidential election (in which Trump was defeated by Joe Biden), Kapenga, along with other Wisconsin Senate Republicans, blocked a resolution to affirm Biden's victory and condemn the U.S. Capitol attack, which resulted in the death of one person.

References

External links
 
 
 
 Official website
 Campaign website
 33rd Senatorial District (2011–2021)

|-

|-

21st-century American politicians
Calvin University alumni
Living people
Republican Party members of the Wisconsin State Assembly
People from Delafield, Wisconsin
Presidents of the Wisconsin Senate
Republican Party Wisconsin state senators
School board members in Wisconsin
Year of birth missing (living people)